The 55th Arizona State Legislature, consisting of the Arizona Senate and the Arizona House of Representatives, is the current legislative session constituted in Phoenix on January 11, 2021, during the second two years of Doug Ducey's second full term in office. Both the Senate and the House membership remained constant at 30 and 60, respectively. In the November 2020 Senate election, Democrats gained one seat, leaving the Republicans with a 16–14 majority. Republicans maintained an unchanged 31–29 majority in the House after the November 2020 House election.

Sessions
The Legislature met in its first regular session at the State Capitol in Phoenix. The session opened on January 11, 2021, and adjourned sine die on June 30, 2021. 

The second regular session began on January 10, 2022, adjourning on June 25, 2022.

There has been one special session, extending from June 15 through June 17, 2021, to address wildfire emergency funding.

Senate

Members

The asterisk (*) denotes members of the previous Legislature who continued in office as members of this Legislature.

House of Representatives

Members 
The asterisk (*) denotes members of the previous Legislature who continued in office as members of this Legislature.

References

Arizona legislative sessions
2021 in Arizona
Arizona